Be Here Soon may refer to:
 Be Here Soon (Jeff Bridges album)
 Be Here Soon (iamamiwhoami album)